Courtney Amanda Shealy (born December 12, 1977), from Irmo, South Carolina, later known by her married name Courtney Hart, is an American former competition swimmer, Olympic gold medalist, and former world record-holder.  Shealy swam the third leg of the world record-breaking women's 4×100-meter freestyle relay team that won gold at the 2000 Summer Olympics.  Her winning teammates were Jenny Thompson, Dara Torres and Amy Van Dyken.  At the same Olympics, she swam in the qualifying heats of the women's 4×100-meter medley relay, and earned a gold medal for doing so.

See also
 List of Olympic medalists in swimming (women)
 List of University of Georgia people
 List of World Aquatics Championships medalists in swimming (women)
 World record progression 4 × 100 metres medley relay

References

External links
 USA Swimming Biography

1977 births
Living people
American female backstroke swimmers
American female freestyle swimmers
World record setters in swimming
Georgia Bulldogs women's swimmers
Medalists at the FINA World Swimming Championships (25 m)
Olympic gold medalists for the United States in swimming
Pan American Games gold medalists for the United States
Pan American Games silver medalists for the United States
Sportspeople from Columbia, South Carolina
Swimmers at the 2000 Summer Olympics
Swimmers at the 2003 Pan American Games
World Aquatics Championships medalists in swimming
Medalists at the 2000 Summer Olympics
Pan American Games medalists in swimming
People from Irmo, South Carolina
Medalists at the 2003 Pan American Games